Neyab (also Romanized as Neyāb, Naiāb, Nīāb, and Niyab) is a village in Momenabad Rural District, in the Central District of Sarbisheh County, South Khorasan Province, Iran. At the 2006 census, its population was 77, in 24 families.

References 

Populated places in Sarbisheh County